Rabeya Khatun (27 December 1935 – 3 January 2021) was a Bangladeshi novelist. She wrote over 50 novels and more than 400 short stories. Her works include essays, novels, research, short stories, religious history and travelogues. She was awarded Bangla Academy Literary Award in 1973, Ekushey Padak in 1993 and Independence Day Award in 2017 by the Government of Bangladesh.

Khatun died of cardiac arrest on 3 January 2021 at her residence in Gulshan, Dhaka.

Early life and education
Khatun was born on 27 December 1935 to Maulavi Mohammad Mulluk Chand and Hamida Khatun in Bikrampur in the then Bengal Presidency, British India (now in Munshiganj District, Bangladesh). She was the second of their three children. Khatun grew up in the Shantinagar area in Dhaka. She passed the entrance examination from Armanitola School in 1948.

On 23 July 1952, she married Fazlul Haque (1930–1990). He was the editor of the Cinema magazine. He directed President, the first film for children in Bangladesh.

Career
Khatun worked at Khawatin magazine, edited by Jahanara Imam. She then worked as the editor of the literature section of the magazine Cinema along with Zahir Raihan. Later she became the editor of the monthly Angana.

Khatun was a council member of Bangla Academy. She was a member of the jury board of Bangladesh National Film Awards, Bangladesh Shishu Academy, Notun Kuri of Bangladesh Television.

Works
Khatun's first story Prashno was published in the weekly Juger Dabi. Her  novel Rajarbagh was published in Begum. She wrote her first novel Madhumati in 1963. She wrote about the Bangladesh Liberation War in her book Ekattorer Noy Maash in 1990. Two of her novels, Nirasraya and Biday O Ashok Reba, have never been published.

Novels
 Madhumati (1963)
 Mon Ek Shwet Kapoti (Mind is a White Pigeon, 1965)
 Ononto Onwesha (Endless Pursuit, 1967)
 Rajarbagh (1967)
 Saheb Bazar (1967)
 Ferari Surjo (Fugitive Sun, 1975)
 Onek Joner Ekjan (One of Many Persons, 1976)
 Jiboner Ar Ek Naam Dibos Rojoni (Another Name of Life is Day and Night,  1980)
 Bayanno Golir Ek Goli (One of Fifty Two Alleys, 1984)
 Baganer Naam Malnichara (Name of the Garden is Malnichara)
 Ei Birohokal (This Time of Separation, 1995)
 Ei Bhora Bador Mah Bhador (This Rainy Day of the Month of Bhadra, 1995)
 Priya Gulshana (Beloved Gulshana, 1997)

Adaptations
Khatun's book-to-film adaptations include Kokhono Megh Kokhono Brishti (2003), Megher Pore Megh (2004) and Madhumati (2011).

Personal life
Khatun lived in Banani, a residential area in Dhaka. She had two sons and two daughters — Faridur Reza Sagar (b. 1955) is the current managing director of Impress Telefilm Limited and Channel i; Keka Ferdousi (b. 1960) is a television chef; Farhadur Reza Probal is an architect; and Farhana Kakoly.

Awards
 Bangla Academy Literary Award (1973)
 Humayun Kadir Memorial  Award (1989)
 Ekushey Padak (1993)
 Kamar Mushtaree Shahitya Puroshkar (1994)
 Lekhika Sangha Award (1994)
 Nasiruddin Gold Medal (1995)
 Shere-e Bangla Gold Medal (1996)
 Jasimuddin Award (1996)
 Shapla-Doyel Award (1996)
 Wrishiz Shahitya Padak (1998)
 Anannya Literature Award (1999)
 Laila Samad Award (1999)
 Millennium Award (2000)
 Sheltech Award (2002)
 Uro Shishu Shahitya Award (2003)
 Michael Madhusudan Award (2005)
 Gettanjali Shommanona Padak (2015)
 Independence Day Award (2017)

References

External links
 

1935 births
2021 deaths
People from Bikrampur
Bangladeshi short story writers
Bangladeshi women novelists
Bangladeshi women writers
Recipients of Bangla Academy Award
Recipients of the Ekushey Padak
Recipients of the Independence Day Award